Tatyana Drubich (born 7 June 1959) is a Russian film actress. She has appeared in 20 films since 1972. She starred in the 1974 film Sto dney posle detstva, which was entered into the 25th Berlin International Film Festival where it won the Silver Bear for Best Director. She was the wife of Russian film director Sergei Solovyov.

Selected filmography
 Sto dney posle detstva (1974) - Lena Ergolina
 And Then There Were None (1987) - Vera Claythorne
 Assa (1987) - Alika
 The Black Monk (1988) - Tania
 Black Rose Is an Emblem of Sorrow, Red Rose Is an Emblem of Love (1989) - Alexandra
 Hello, Fools! (1996) - Ksenia Zasypkina/Polina Derulen
 Moscow (2000) - Olga

References

External links

1959 births
Living people
Russian film actresses
Actresses from Moscow
20th-century Russian actresses